Chris McPhee (born 20th March 1983) is an English footballer who plays as a midfielder or striker and last played at Frome Town.

Career
Born in Eastbourne, East Sussex, McPhee began his career as a trainee with Brighton & Hove Albion, turning professional in August 1999, and made his debut, aged 16, at Swansea City in December 1999. He broke into the first team on a regular basis in the 2003–04 and 2004–05 seasons, when he made over 50 appearances despite missing several months of the 2004–05 season due to a foot injury suffered in October 2004.

McPhee joined Conference National side Aldershot Town on loan in August 2005, where he made 14 appearances. He returned to Brighton in November 2005 but struggled to break into the first team and made only seven appearances before joining Swindon Town in March 2006 on loan until the end of the 2005–06 season. He was released by Brighton after the club was relegated from the Championship at the end of the 2005–06 season and joined Torquay United in July 2006, making his Torquay debut in the 1–0 home win against Rochdale in the following month. He made 43 league and cup appearances for Torquay in the 2006–07 season.

McPhee joined Ebbsfleet United in August 2007 on non-contract terms after impressing in a trial period and after making 20 appearances for Ebbsfleet in the Conference National, he agreed a contract in November 2007 until the end of the 2007–08 season. In May 2008, he scored the winning goal as Ebbsfleet won the 2007–08 FA Trophy at Wembley Stadium against Torquay United and was named "Man of the Match" after the game. McPhee also won Player of the Season that year, voted for by the fans. He left Ebbsfleet in June 2008, after participating in a successful Four Nations Tournament campaign with England C, when he failed to agree a new deal with the Fleet. He turned down several League offers and moved to Devon to be with his new family.

McPhee joined Weymouth on 3 July 2008. He signed for Kidderminster Harriers on a contract until the end of the 2008–09 season on 26 February after leaving Weymouth, who had not paid his wages during 2009. He signed a new two-year contract with Kidderminster in July.

On 28 June 2011, it was announced that McPhee was to rejoin former club, Torquay United.

After the 2011–12 season, Chris moved to Salisbury City, he signed as a player-coach. Chris was looking at moving into coaching after his playing career ended and so cited a move to Salisbury as beneficial to this. The move to Salisbury was made more attractive because of the opportunities to coach as well as play regularly.

Chris McPhee is now coaching full time in Exeter City’s academy as the Youth Development Phase lead coach. Chris Holds a UEFA A coaches licence and has an FA Advanced Youth Award Qualification too boot.

Honours
Ebbsfleet United
FA Trophy: 2008
Salisbury City
Conference South play-offs: 2012–13

References

External links

1983 births
Living people
Sportspeople from Eastbourne
English footballers
England semi-pro international footballers
Association football midfielders
Brighton & Hove Albion F.C. players
Aldershot Town F.C. players
Swindon Town F.C. players
Torquay United F.C. players
Ebbsfleet United F.C. players
Weymouth F.C. players
Kidderminster Harriers F.C. players
Salisbury City F.C. players
English Football League players
National League (English football) players